Montboucher is a commune in the Creuse department in the Nouvelle-Aquitaine region in central France.

Geography
The commune is on the border with the departement of Haute-Vienne.

Population

Sights
 The neo-gothic church, dating from the nineteenth century.
 The nineteenth-century Château de Vedrenas .

See also
Communes of the Creuse department

References

Communes of Creuse